Felipe de Cresce El Debs (born 29 January 1985) is a Brazilian chess player who holds the FIDE title of Grandmaster. He competed in the FIDE World Cup in 2017. El Debs played for the Brazilian team in the Chess Olympiad and Pan American Team Chess Championship. In this latter event, in 2013, his team finished third. In 2004 he won the Brazilian under-20 championship with a score of 100%.

References

External links
 
 
 
 
 Interview with Felipe El Debs by Taís Julião 
 Interview with Felipe El Debs by XadrezTotal 

1985 births
Living people
Chess grandmasters
Chess Olympiad competitors
Brazilian chess players
Brazilian people of Italian descent
Brazilian people of Lebanese descent
People from São Carlos
Sportspeople of Lebanese descent